American artist Jay-Z has released thirteen solo studio albums, four collaboration albums, one live album, one compilation album, one soundtrack album, two extended plays, one hundred and fifteen singles (including forty-five as a featured artist), nine promotional singles and eighty-two music videos. As of December 2014, Jay-Z has sold 29,179,000 studio albums in United States.

Jay-Z began his music career in the 1980s, building a reputation as a fledgling rapper in his hometown of Brooklyn and collaborating with his mentor and fellow rapper Jaz-O. Jay-Z later founded Roc-A-Fella Records with close friends Damon Dash and Kareem "Biggs" Burke and released his debut studio album Reasonable Doubt in June 1996. The album peaked at number twenty-three on the United States Billboard 200 record chart and has since been recognized as a seminal work of the hip hop genre. Its singles included "Dead Presidents", "Ain't No Nigga" and "Can't Knock the Hustle", all of which reached the top ten on the Billboard Hot Rap Songs chart. In My Lifetime, Vol. 1 (1997), which saw Jay-Z collaborating with producers such as Sean "Puff Daddy" Combs and Teddy Riley, peaked at number three on the Billboard 200 and earned a platinum certification from the Recording Industry Association of America (RIAA). Vol. 2... Hard Knock Life was released in September 1998 and became his first number-one album in the United States. The album featured the international hits "Can I Get A..." and "Hard Knock Life (Ghetto Anthem)", which both reached top twenty of the Billboard Hot 100. Vol. 2 was certified five times platinum by the RIAA and won the Grammy Award for Best Rap Album in 1999. Two more chart-topping albums – Vol. 3... Life and Times of S. Carter and The Dynasty: Roc La Familia – followed in December 1999 and October 2000 respectively. The albums included hit singles such as "Big Pimpin'" and "I Just Wanna Love U (Give It 2 Me)" and featured several guest appearances from artists signed to Roc-A-Fella Records.

Jay-Z's sixth studio album The Blueprint, released in September 2001, topped the Billboard 200 and produced Jay-Z's first Billboard Hot 100 top ten single, "Izzo (H.O.V.A.)". The Blueprint is critically reviewed as his best album. The Best of Both Worlds, a collaboration with American R&B singer R. Kelly, and The Blueprint 2: The Gift & The Curse were both released the following year. The latter album peaked at number one on the Billboard 200 and featured the top ten singles "'03 Bonnie & Clyde" and "Excuse Me Miss". The Black Album, released in November 2003, was intended by Jay-Z to be his final studio album and features his impending retirement as a recurring theme. The album performed well commercially and was later certified 3x Multi-Platinum by the RIAA.

Following a period of dormancy, Jay-Z became president of Def Jam Recordings in December 2004 and resumed his rap career two years later with the release of Kingdom Come, which peaked at number one on the Billboard 200 and was certified 2x Multi-Platinum by the RIAA. The concept album American Gangster followed in 2007 and continued his streak of number-one albums in the United States. With the release of The Blueprint 3 in September 2009, Jay-Z surpassed Elvis Presley as the solo artist with the most number-one albums on the Billboard 200. The album included the international hits "Run This Town", "Empire State of Mind" and "Young Forever". Watch the Throne, a collaborative album with American rapper Kanye West, followed in August 2011 and became Jay-Z's eleventh number-one album in the United States. His album Magna Carta Holy Grail was released in July 2013 to great commercial success, topping the Billboard 200 and having the second-biggest sales week for 2013 at the time of its release.

Studio albums

Collaborative albums

Compilation albums

Soundtrack albums

Live albums

Mixtapes

Notes

See also
 Jay-Z singles discography
 The Carters

References

External links
 
 Jay-Z at AllMusic

Discography
Discographies of American artists
Hip hop discographies